Andrey Meshcheryakov (born 20 April 1984 in Moscow) is a Russian swimmer and wheelchair curler. He has represented Russia at both the IPC World Championships and the 2012 Summer Paralympics. As a curler he was a participant of the 2018 Winter Paralympic games and World Wheelchair Curling Championships of 2019, 2020; he is a 2020 World champion.

Personal history
Meshcheryakov was born in 1994. He matriculated to Moscow State University of Economics, Statistics, and Informatics where he studied law. He was severely injured in a car accident resulting in permanent disabilities. He is married to Anastasia and as of 2014 has one child. In 2014 he became the first torch barer when the flame came to his home town of Moscow as part of the Winter Paralympics in Sochi.

Swimming career
After his accident Meshcheryakov initially took up table tennis, but switched to swimming as part of his rehabilitation. A water polo player before his injuries, Meshcheryakov showed promise as a parasport swimmer and was coached by Natalia Stepanova. Classified as an S3 swimmer, he competed for Russia at the 2011 IPC Swimming European Championships and won silver in the 50m freestyle behind Ukraine's Dmytro Vynohradets. He followed this with a bronze in the 50m backstroke at the same Championship.

Two years later he again represented Russia, travelling to Montreal to compete in the 2013 IPC Swimming World Championships. There he took three medals, all bronze, in the 50m freestyle, 100m freestyle and 200m freestyle. In 2012 he qualified for his first Summer Paralympics, where he entered four events in the London Games. He failed to reach the final in the 100m S4 freestyle, limited by the fact that his S3 classification was not given its own 100m competition. He qualified for the finals in the 50m breaststroke SB2, 150m individual medley SM3 and the 50m backstroke S3 but he was unable to medal.

Curling teams and events

References

External links

 

Paralympic swimmers of Russia
Swimmers at the 2012 Summer Paralympics
Russian male freestyle swimmers
Living people
1994 births
Medalists at the World Para Swimming Championships
Medalists at the World Para Swimming European Championships
Russian male curlers
Russian wheelchair curlers
World wheelchair curling champions
Russian curling champions
S3-classified Paralympic swimmers